The International Conference on Intelligent Tutoring Systems (ITS) is the oldest conference series in the field of intelligent educational systems. It was established in 1988 by Claude Frasson. The first several events were held every four years and, while engaging a broad international audience, were always located in Montreal, Canada. The growth of the field encouraged the transformation into a biannual internationally organized event, which was originally held every other year, opposite the International Conference on Artificial Intelligence in Education. Since 1992, the Proceedings of the conference are being published by Springer in the popular Lecture Notes in Computer Science series.

The conference was hosted in Montreal by Claude Frasson and Gilles Gauthier in 1988, 1992, 1996, and 2000; in San Antonio (US) by Carol Redfield and Valerie Shute in 1998; in Biarritz (France) and San Sebastian (Spain) by Guy Gouardères and Stefano Cerri in 2002; in Maceio (Brazil) by Rosa Maria Vicari and Fábio Paraguaçu in 2004; in Jhongli (Taiwan) by Tak-Wai Chan in 2006. The conference was back to Montreal in 2008 (for its 20th anniversary) and hosted by Roger Nkambou and Susanne Lajoie. ITS 2010 was held in Pittsburgh (US), hosted by Jack Mostow, Judy Kay, and Vincent Aleven. ITS 2012 was held in Chania (Crete), hosted by George Papadourakis, Stefano Cerri and William Clancey. ITS 2014 was held in Honolulu (Hawaii, US), hosted by Martha Crosby, Stefan Trausan-Matu, and Kristy Elizabeth Boyer. In 2018 the ITS 2018 conference is once again back to Montreal, hosted by Roger Nkambou, for the 30th anniversary of the series.

References

External links
 The 11th International Conference on Intelligent Tutoring Systems – Co-adaptation in Learning – Chania (2012)
 The 10th International Conference on Intelligent Tutoring Systems – Bridges to Learning – Pittsburgh (2010)
 The 9th International Conference on Intelligent Tutoring Systems - Intelligent Tutoring Systems: Past and Future – Montreal (2008)
 The 8th International Conference on Intelligent Tutoring Systems (2006)

Computer science conferences
Artificial intelligence conferences